Joseph Wagner (1706 – 1780) was a highly regarded eighteenth century German engraver and draughtsman.

Biography
He was born in Thalendorf in Gestratz, on Lake Constance, in 1706.  He studied painting at Venice under Jacopo Amigoni, who persuaded him to turn to engraving, and Wagner accompanied Amigoni to Rome and Bologna, and in 1733 to England.  He afterwards went to Paris, to study engraving under Laurent Cars.  He then made a second stay in England, where his first productions were portraits of the three princesses, Anne, Amelia, and Caroline, the daughters of George ll.  He engraved several other plates in England, but returned to Venice, where he opened a school and also carried on a considerable business as a print seller.  He died in Munich in 1780. His prints are very numerous, and his students included Francesco Bartolozzi, Antonio Capellan, Fabio Berardi and Jean Jacques Flipart.

References
This article incorporates text from the article "Wagner, Joseph" in Bryan's Dictionary of Painters and Engravers  by Michael Bryan, edited by Robert Edmund Graves and Sir Walter Armstrong, a 1905 publication now in the public domain. G. Bell and Sons, London.

1706 births
1780 deaths
German engravers
German printmakers